Mord Sighvatsson (c. 900–968;;), better known as Mord "Fiddle" was a wealthy Icelandic farmer and expert on Icelandic law who lived during the late Settlement Period and early Commonwealth Period. According to Njals Saga, he was the son of Sighvat the Red, but Landnámabók asserts that Mord was Sighvat's grandson. Mord was the father of Unn Mordardottir, who for a time was married to Hrútr Herjólfsson.

Gunnhild, Mother of Kings, the mother of Harald II of Norway and his brothers and Queen Mother of Norway, had been Hrútr's patron and lover while he sojourned in that land. When Hrútr returned home, Gunnhild gave him many presents, but she cursed Hrútr with priapism to ruin his marriage to Unn. It was Mord who masterminded Unn's divorce from Hrútr by advising her on procedures she could use to name witnesses and announce the divorce while Hrut was away.

Notes

References
Ari the Learned. The Book of the Settlement of Iceland (Landnámabók). Ellwood, T., transl. Kendal: T. Wilson, Printer and Publisher, 1898.
Byock, Jesse L. Viking Age Iceland. Penguin, 2001.
Fox, Denton. "Njals Saga and the Western Literary Tradition." Comparative Literature, Vol. 15, No. 4 (Autumn, 1963), p. 289–310.
Magnusson, Magnus, and Hermann Palsson, trans. Njal's Saga. Penguin Classics, 1960.
Ordower, Henry. "Exploring the Literary Function of Law and Litigation in 'Njal's Saga.'" Cardozo Studies in Law and Literature, Vol. 3, No. 1 (Spring – Summer 1991), pp. 41–61.
Smiley, Jane, ed. Laxdaela Saga. The Sagas of Icelanders. Penguin, 2001.

10th-century Icelandic people
900s births
968 deaths
Year of birth uncertain